Jurgen Peqini (born 24 August 1998), is an Albanian professional footballer who plays as a midfielder for Albanian club Turbina Cërrik in the Albanian First Division.

Club career

Early career
Peqini started his youth career at age of 14 with KF Elbasani in September 2012. During the 2013–14 season he played with under-17 side and made 22 appearances. In the 2015–16 season he appeared for under-19 side playing 14 matches and scoring 2 goals and also he gained entry with the first team.

Elbasani
Peqini participated for the first time with the first team of Elbasani in the 2015–16 Albanian First Division 3rd game week against Turbina Cerrik on 26 September 2015, where however he was an unused substitute. Four days later he managed to make his first professional debut and to score his first goal against Kamza in a match valid for the 2015–16 Albanian Cup First Round. Peqini started the match on the bench, came in as a substitute in the 55th minute in place of Andi Mahilaj and scored in the 72nd minute to give his team the 1–1 home draw. On 24 October 2015 he made it his first Albanian First Division debut against Dinamo Tirana coming on as a substitute in the 71st minute in place of Andi Mahilaj in a 0–1 loss.

International career
He was called up for the first time at international level in the Albania national under-19 football team by coach Arjan Bellaj for two friendly matches against Kosovo U19 on 13 & 15 October 2015.

Career statistics

Club

Personal life
Peqini hails from a footballing family with his father, Kastriot Peqini earning 11 caps with the national team and his grandfather Sabri Peqini played for Dinamo Tirana.

References

External links

Jurgen Peqini profile FSHF.org

1998 births
Living people
Footballers from Elbasan
Albanian footballers
Association football forwards
Albania youth international footballers
KF Elbasani players
KF Teuta Durrës players
KF Erzeni players
KS Turbina Cërrik players
Kategoria e Parë players
Kategoria Superiore players